SCAD World School is a start-up K-12 residential school at Palladam, Coimbatore, Tamil Nadu, affiliated to CIE (Cambridge International Curriculum).

Facilities
 Library
 Laboratories
 Classrooms
 Internet access
 Hostels
 Cafeteria
 Medical Care
 Pastoral Care
 Computer Lab
 Activities
 Sports & Games

External links
 Official Website 

Private schools in Tamil Nadu
International schools in India
Cambridge schools in India
Primary schools in Tamil Nadu
High schools and secondary schools in Tamil Nadu
Boarding schools in Tamil Nadu
Schools in Coimbatore
Educational institutions established in 2012
2012 establishments in Tamil Nadu